Graham Spooner (2 March 1933 – 30 March 2015) was  a former Australian rules footballer who played with Fitzroy in the Victorian Football League (VFL).

Notes

External links 

1933 births
2015 deaths
Australian rules footballers from Victoria (Australia)
Fitzroy Football Club players